Dry Plain is a locality in the Snowy Monaro Region, New South Wales, Australia. It is about 160 km south of Canberra.

It had a school from June 1925 to October 1927, generally described as a "half-time" school.

References

Snowy Monaro Regional Council
Localities in New South Wales